The People's Political Movement was a political party in Saint Kitts-Nevis-Anguilla. The party contested the 1961 general elections, receiving 11.1% of the vote, but failed to win a seat. They did not contest any further elections.

References

Political parties in Saint Kitts and Nevis
1960s in Saint Kitts and Nevis